William Charles Common Steele (born 18 April 1947) also known as Billy Steele, is a former Scotland international rugby union player.

The first club he played for was Langholm RFC, in his hometown of Langholm in south west Scotland.

He represented the British & Irish Lions on the 1974 tour to South Africa and at the time played club rugby for Bedford F.C.

His "day job" was in the RAF.

As Richard Bath says:
"Never the quickest of wingers, Steele's gritty defensive qualities and combative nature combined perfectly with some of the more attacking Scottish internationals of his day, particularly Andy Irvine and David Shedden."

References
 Bath, Richard (ed.) The Complete Book of Rugby (Seven Oaks Ltd, 1997 )

1947 births
Living people
Scottish rugby union players
Scotland international rugby union players
British & Irish Lions rugby union players from Scotland
Bedford Blues players
Langholm RFC players
Combined Services rugby union players
20th-century Royal Air Force personnel
Royal Air Force Physical Training instructors
Royal Air Force rugby union players
Rugby union players from Langholm